Abdullah Akhunzada (born 18 March 1980) is a cricketer who plays for the Kuwait national cricket team. He made his List A debut in the 2010 ICC World Cricket League Division Eight tournament.

References

External links 
 

1980 births
Living people
Kuwaiti cricketers
Pakistani expatriates in Kuwait